Knowledge Unlatched (KU) is an Open Access service provider registered as a for-profit GmbH in Berlin, Germany, and owned by multinational commercial publishing company Wiley as of December 2021. It offers a crowdfunding model to support a variety of Open Access book and journal content packages as well as the financial funding of partnerships.

History 

Knowledge Unlatched was established in September 2012 by publisher and social entrepreneur Frances Pinter. It was the formalisation of the ‘Global Library Consortium’ model for supporting Open Access books, developed by Pinter as a response to a protracted crisis in monograph publishing and the opportunities presented by digital technology and Open Access models.

Pinter first aired her vision for a Global Library Consortium approach to supporting Open Access monograph publishing at the Charleston Conference in 2010. In September 2011, she embarked on a speaking tour of Australia. Her tour included a keynote presentation on academic publishing and the future of the monograph at Queensland University of Technology, arranged by Lucy Montgomery, who would go on to become Deputy Director of Knowledge Unlatched.

In 2016, the legal structure of Knowledge Unlatched (KU) was changed from a British Community Interest Company (CIC) to a German GmbH (limited liability company). In that year, Sven Fund acquired parts of KU CIC's assets, while transferring them into a for-profit company, Knowledge Unlatched GmbH, which is 100% owned by the consultancy fullstopp GmbH. Sven Fund is managing director of both companies. Pinter, the founder of KU CIC, was planning to retire in that period and became director of the then legally independent research unit, KU Research, which operates under the former founding organisation's name, KU CIC.

Business model 

In its first two collections (the Pilot and Round 2), Knowledge Unlatched piloted a collective procurement approach to Open Access books. The model put forward by Pinter in 2011 depends on many libraries from around the world sharing the payment of a single title fee to a publisher, in return for a book being made available via a Creative Commons licence through one of Open Access repository services, such as the Open Research Library, "Open Access Publishing in European Networks" (OAPEN) and the HathiTrust Digital Library as a fully downloadable PDF or EPUB file.

According to multiple sources, Knowledge Unlatched is cited among other innovative publishing-market initiatives focused on the Open Access sector that have been successful in pooling the funding from subscribing libraries for covering the costs of transitioning monographs or journals into Gold Open Access, which removes access barriers to readers around the world.

KU Open Funding 
KU Open Funding is a database for financing Open Access books. It enables scientists and libraries to compare offerings from different publishers. Suitable offers can be found on the basis of more than 20 criteria, such as the subject area, the services of publishers, forms of licensing and publication costs. If the latter accepts the manuscript for publication after quality control, KU organises the approval and handling of payment with the library. More than twenty publishers such as Berghahn Books, Duke University Press, Intellect, University of Michigan Press, Taylor & Francis, Transcript Verlag and Ubiquity Press participated with their Open Access offerings during the launch in November 2018.

KU Partners 
Knowledge Unlatched partners with several open access initiatives, which includes collects funding. To date KU has partnered up with 12 different initiatives including OAPEN, IntechOpen, Language Science Press, the Peter Lang publishing group, and Transcript Open Library Political Science. As predatory publishers represent a concern for the Open Access sector, Knowledge Unlatched is not involved directly in quality assurance procedures, for which publishers bear sole responsibility. This topic is widely discussed in relation to the publication of scholarly articles. Yet with regard to both academic monographs and scholarly papers, publisher-level review procedures and industry-wide quality assurance mechanisms exist. In addition, divergent opinions exist concerning the harm of predatory publishing, particularly in relation to the role of Open Access in rendering scientific and scholarly knowledge widely accessible as a public good, as Martin Paul Eve and Ernesto Priego have argued in their article. As the role of preprint servers during the Covid-19 crisis indicates, Open Access is not antithetical to maintaining quality controls with regard to disseminating research results.

Awards 
Knowledge Unlatched was shortlisted for the ALPSP Awards for Innovation in Publishing 2016. 

In September 2015, Knowledge Unlatched won the Curtin University Award for Best Innovation in Education 2015. The competition attracted a record 46 applications from across Curtin University with 12 applicants shortlisted to present to a panel of judges looking at novelty, level of development, market potential and competitive advantage.

In June 2014, Knowledge Unlatched was selected as the 2014 winner of the IFLA/Brill Open Access Award. The jury for the prize awarded by the International Federation of Library Associations and Institutions (IFLA) and Brill Publishers voted unanimously for Knowledge Unlatched.

In February 2015, Knowledge Unlatched was named by Outsell, Inc., as one of their 10 to companies to watch.

See also 
 Open access in Germany

References

External links 
 Official website
 Official KU Past Collections website
 KU Full Pilot Report

Non-profit organisations based in the United Kingdom
Organizations established in 2012
Open access projects
2012 establishments in the United Kingdom
Open access publishers
Library publishing
Wiley (publisher)